Madaras is a Hungarian surname. Notable people with the surname include:

 Ádám Madaras (born 1966), Hungarian pentathlete, fencer, actor, stuntman and media entrepreneur
 Gergely Madaras (born 1984), Hungarian conductor
 Gyula Madarász (1858–1931), Hungarian ornithologist and nature artist
 József Madaras (1937–2007), Hungarian actor
 Lynda Madaras (late 20th c.), American educator and writer
 Norbert Madaras (born 1979), Hungarian water polo player
 Oksana Madaras (born 1969), Ukrainian conductor

Hungarian-language surnames